Chay Baghi (also Romanized as Chāy Bāghī; also known as Chahār Bāghī) is a village in Qareh Naz Rural District, in the Central District of Maragheh County, East Azerbaijan Province, Iran. At the 2006 census, its population was 279, in 62 families.

References 

Towns and villages in Maragheh County